Ferdinando Lignano (born 13 August 1948) is an Italian former water polo player. He competed in the men's tournament at the 1972 Summer Olympics.

See also
 Italy men's Olympic water polo team records and statistics
 List of men's Olympic water polo tournament goalkeepers

References

External links
 

1948 births
Living people
Italian male water polo players
Water polo goalkeepers
Olympic water polo players of Italy
Water polo players at the 1972 Summer Olympics
Water polo players from Naples